The Asian Institute of Journalism and Communication is a graduate school in media studies in the Philippines. It is considered one of the leading communication institutions in the Philippines and the ASEAN region.

It provides graduate education and professional training.

History
The institute was established in 1980 as the Asian Institute of Journalism. In 1994, it was renamed the Asian Institute of Journalism and Communication to expand to other forms of media.

Research and development
AIJC's research program includes policy research; design, implementation and evaluation of development communication initiatives, public information, social mobilization and advocacy programs; and design and implementation of management information systems.

Making a difference in national development, many outputs of the Research, Policy, and Advocacy unit have been institutionalized in development programs. These outputs have been reflected or integrated in the following:
 1987 Philippine Constitution
 Supreme Court Blueprint for Action on Judicial Reform
 Action Program for Judicial Reform
 Philippine Agenda 21
 Education for All program
 Country Program for Children
 Literacy Coordinating Council Blueprint for Action
 Communication plans of sustainable development programs, i.e., clean air, fisheries and coastal resource management, and renewable energy, among others.

References

External links
 

Universities and colleges in Manila
Graduate schools in the Philippines
Liberal arts colleges in the Philippines
Journalism schools in Asia
Broadcasting schools
Education in Sampaloc, Manila
Educational institutions established in 1980
Philippine journalism organizations
1980 establishments in the Philippines